The 1971 New York Cosmos season was the inaugural season for the New York Cosmos, an expansion team in the now-defunct North American Soccer League. In the Cosmos' first year of existence, the club finished 2nd in the Northern Division and 4th in the overall league table.  In the playoffs, the Cosmos were eliminated by the Atlanta Chiefs in the first two games of the best-of-three semifinals.

Squad  

 

Source:

Results 
Source:

Friendlies

Regular season 
Pld = Games Played, W = Wins, L = Losses, D = Draws, GF = Goals For, GA = Goals Against, Pts = Points
6 points for a win, 3 points for a draw, 0 points for a loss, 1 point for each goal scored (up to three per game).

Northern Division Standings

Overall League Placing 

Source:

Matches

Postseason

Overview

Semi-finals

Final

Matches

References

See also
1971 North American Soccer League season
List of New York Cosmos seasons

1971 in American soccer
New York Cosmos
New York Cosmos seasons
New York
New York Cosmos